The Roslyn Cemetery is a historic cemetery located on Route 25A (Northern Boulevard) in the town of Greenvale, Nassau County, New York. It is owned by the Roslyn Presbyterian Church which is located within the Village of Roslyn. The Roslyn Cemetery is a product of the "Rural Cemetery Act" of which one of the many intents was to move burial grounds away from the local church and community as well as to design the grounds in a park like setting. This is clearly evident in the "Roslyn Cemetery" which is more like a botanical garden than a cemetery. Interments began in the 19th century and it continues to accept burials today. The cemetery has many notable figures as well as a section dedicated to fallen Civil War soldiers.

The "East Gate Toll House" which sits on the south east side of the "Roslyn Cemetery" and is clearly seen from Northern Blvd. (Route 25A) is the last remaining toll house that served the North Hempstead Turnpike. It was built around 1864 and is frequently but incorrectly referred to as  being a toll house for the Vanderbilt Motor Parkway which ran considerably south of this location. Over the years the toll road had ceased operation and the main road was moved south of the toll house. The "Roslyn Cemetery" eventually surrounded the property. This structure sat unoccupied for many years and served little more than a shed for cemetery work tools. In the 1980s it was restored. It serves as a private residence and is on the National Register of Historic Places, as is the surrounding cemetery.

Notable interments
 William Cullen Bryant, poet and journalist, lived in Roslyn
 Frances Hodgson Burnett, author of The Secret Garden, A Little Princess and Little Lord Fauntleroy
 Christopher Morley, poet and journalist, lived in Roslyn
 Stephen Taber, a United States Congressman from New York from 1865–1869
 William Tavoulareas, President of Mobil Corporation 1969–1984 lived in Sands Pt.

References

External links
 
Political Graveyard interments at Roslyn Cemetery

Cemeteries on the National Register of Historic Places in New York (state)
Cemeteries in Nassau County, New York
National Register of Historic Places in North Hempstead (town), New York